Lunacy, released in Europe as Torico and in Japan as , is an adventure game developed by System Sacom and published by Sega for the Sega Saturn in 1996. Lunacy is an interactive movie adventure consisting of a long series of interconnecting full motion video (FMV) sequences, much like The 7th Guest and System Sacom's earlier Saturn game, Mansion of Hidden Souls.

Storyline

A traveler called Fred finds himself imprisoned in Misty Town jail. He came to the village in search of answers to his past, a past of which he has no recollection. On his head, he bears a crescent shaped tattoo. In his cell, Fred meets the strange and seemingly all-knowing Anthony, who tells him of the legends of the City of Moons. It is said that the road to the City lies through the Misty Town. Anthony offers him the key to his cell, but after an attempted escape, Fred quickly finds himself back in the hands of Lord Gordon, the ruthless town ruler.

Lord Gordon condemns the traveler to death, but offers him a chance to save his life. If he can find the entrance to the City of Moons he will be spared. Fred begins his search for the fabled city, shadowed by Lord Gordon's sadistic henchman Jade. Throughout the village he meets the various people that populate the Misty Town, such as the irritable Dr. Morse, the soft-spoken Rose, and the melancholic Gray. A dried up well may or may not hold the key to his mystery and as his quest unfolds, Fred's path will lead him across various items that may serve one magical function or another. Matches, oil, treesap and red paint prove to be an integral part of the puzzle.

Characters
Fred: Also known as "The Traveler", Fred wanders around the City of Mists trying to uncover his forgotten identity. His forehead bears the imprint of a strange symbol, which seems to be the source of his amnesia.

The inhabitants of Misty Town
Lord Gordon: A cold and ruthless man, Lord Gordon rules the Misty Town with an iron fist, alleviating his boredom by using people as pawns in his cruel games. Years ago, he fell in love with a girl called Louise, but she rejected his advances. When he tried to force her into marrying him, she committed suicide. Embittered, Lord Gordon has locked himself up in his mansion ever since.
Jade: Jade is Lord Gordon's right-hand man, and carries out his will with brutal efficiency. Always prowling the streets of Misty Town, he seems to take great pleasure in his work. He likes to pick on Fred and Anthony.
Zaboo: Zaboo is Lord Gordon's enigmatic consort. She rarely leaves his side. It is later revealed she was a traveler once, and like Fred, found the City of Moons only to return with no recollection of her memory and a crescent tattoo on her forehead. When Lord Gordon found her he took her in and she has remained loyal to him ever since.
Anthony: Anthony has few interests in the world of his fellow man, preferring to concentrate on his butterfly collection. Fred is first introduced to this peculiar character in Misty Town jail, where he claims to be the regular. However Anthony helps Fred along his way with resources and advice. He seems to know a lot about the City of Moons.
Mac: The eccentric owner of a quaint clock shop, Mac has no respect for those who do not respect time.
Dr. Morse: Dr. Morse is the crotchety town physician and Lord Gordon's personal doctor. He does not like to be disturbed, but his door is always open. He has some knowledge of herbal remedy.
Rose: A kindhearted soul, Rose ekes out a humble living by tending her flower shop. All her flowers belong to Lord Gordon.
Hal: Hal is Rose's son. He likes to follow Fred around town, and hopes to become a traveler himself one day.
Gray: Gray has never recovered from the loss of his daughter Louise. He tends her grave but refuses to accept she is gone. He shares Fred's desire to find the City of Moons.
Hannah: Hannah runs a dilapidated inn near Lord Gordon's manor. She takes a keen interest in handsome young travelers. She once loved a man in Misty Town who was a painter, but he disappeared after Lord Gordon ordered his house to be burned down.

The inhabitants of the City of Moons
Ray: Ray acts as a spirit protector to the City of Moons and its inhabitants. She takes the appearance of a ghostly old woman and offers advice to Fred.
Louise: Louise seems to be locked up in the Tower of Moons, permanently turned to stone until her lover returns.
Meg: A childlike spirit mysteriously bound to Fred, Meg guides the traveler along his way through the City of Moons.

Gameplay

Lunacy is set in two major locations: Misty Town and the City of Moons. Correspondingly, the game is divided into two discs. Once the player finishes disc 1, disc 2 can be accessed and continues from there.

Although the game maintains the illusion of free three-dimensional movement, in reality each action loads a pre-scripted FMV sequence. Gameplay is essentially restricted to moving left and right, forward and backward or moving in to examine certain objects. The story is followed through a first-person perspective. Some events may not trigger until Fred has spoken to one of the townspeople. Items can be collected and every important encounter is stored in a memory log. The player can save progress anywhere, anytime.

While the storyline of disc 1 follows a fairly linear course, disc 2 allows for multiple outcomes to the game, depending on what choices the player makes at a given moment or which items are used.

Miscellaneous
The number 4 seems to hold some significance in Lunacy. The gateway to the City of Moons can only be accessed once every four years. Correspondingly, the wind blows only once every four years in Misty Town. In the City of Moons, the object is to free four butterflies, each of which connects roughly to one of the four elements: earth, water, wind and fire (light). When Fred descends into the well to find the gateway to the City of Moons it is these four elements that open the portal when brought together.

Anthony seems to be the only character unaffected by the City of Moons, as he is not imprisoned when he arrives nor does he suffer from amnesia after he leaves.

A number of hidden bonus movies can be accessed after the game is completed by re-inserting disc 1 and entering the code x, y, z, a, b, c, l, r at the title screen. Depending on the outcome of the main game, the player will get to see 1 or 5 movies, among others the hidden sequence where Zaboo reveals her past.

Development
Though Atlus USA published Lunacy in North America, the game was translated and localized by Sega. Sega offered the game's North American publication rights to third party companies so that they could devote more of their marketing efforts to more high-profile games.

Reception

Though Lunacy met with a range of critical opinions, reviews almost universally agreed that the game combines compelling story elements and graphics with the limited gameplay typical of the interactive movie genre. Critics particularly remarked that the graphics are exceptionally detailed and effectively bring to life the surreal settings, though some criticized that the characters' walking animations look fake. Most critics disapproved of the gameplay, particularly that the puzzles are shallow and insultingly easy, an insult deepened by the hints given out by the characters. Next Generation reviewed the Sega Saturn version of the game from Japan, rating it four stars out of five, and stated that "The mere fact that the game simply keeps moving at its own irresistible pace is enough to keep players pressing on in their quest to uncover its secrets. Torico is a must for all graphic adventure fans."

The game's bizarre and often cryptic dialogue (described by Glenn Rubenstein in GameSpot as "David Lynch meets David Mamet") was the subject of considerable commentary and varying reactions. Some found it intriguing, while others characterized it as confusing or stilted in a manner suggestive of English being spoken as a second language. The English dub was praised for the quality of the acting but criticized for the poor lip syncing, typically both by the same critic. Reviewing an import copy, Diehard GameFans reviewers said the game was a rare example of an FMV game done right, praising the graphics, music and setting. Most of Electronic Gaming Monthlys four reviewers found the game too slow-paced and mundane, especially in its first half, though Dan Hsu had a mildly positive response, remarking that "Lunacy brings a bit of variety to a market packed with game clones." Stephen Fulljames gave it a negative review in Sega Saturn Magazine, asserting that "'interactive movies' will never be as exciting or playable as something generated in real time." A reviewer for Next Generation concluded, "Although not a very deep title, Lunacy is just stylish enough to be as entertaining as a good late night movie or suspense novel." Rubenstein similarly said that it was not really a game, but that it "makes up for its lack of interactivity with sheer entertainment value." GamePro was most enthusiastic about the game, scoring it a 4.0 out of 5 in graphics and funfactor and a perfect 5.0 in sound and control, summarizing that "This slick, creepy game combines Ds eerie, latent sensuality with Mysts otherworldliness to create a challenging, captivating, movie-like mystery."

See also
Shadow of Memories

References

Sega Saturn games
Sega Saturn-only games
1996 video games
Adventure games
System Sacom games
Full motion video based games
Single-player video games
Sega video games
Atlus games
Video games about amnesia
Video games with alternate endings
Video games developed in Japan